The name Cyrk may refer to:

Cyrk (company), a promotions company
Cyrk (art), Polish posters